The 1922 Minnesota gubernatorial election took place on November 7, 1922. Republican Party of Minnesota candidate J. A. O. Preus defeated Farmer–Labor Party challenger Magnus Johnson.

Results

See also
 List of Minnesota gubernatorial elections

External links
 http://www.sos.state.mn.us/home/index.asp?page=653
 http://www.sos.state.mn.us/home/index.asp?page=657

Minnesota
Gubernatorial
1922
November 1922 events